The 2018–19 Liga Alef season was the 10th season as third tier since its re-alignment in 2009 and the 77th season of third-tier football in Israel.

Changes from last season

Team changes
 Hapoel Iksal and Sektzia Nes Tziona were promoted to Liga Leumit; Ironi Nesher (to North division) and Maccabi Herzliya (to South division) were relegated from Liga Leumit.
 Hapoel Beit She’an was relegated to Liga Bet from the North division, along with Maccabi Daliyat al-Karmet, who folded during the season. The two clubs were replaced by Hapoel Kaukab and Hapoel Bnei Zalafa , which were promoted to the North division from Liga Bet.
 F.C. Dimona and Hapoel Hod HaSharon were relegated to Liga Bet from South division and were replaced by Shimshon Kafr Qasim and Agudat Sport Ashdod (Hapoel Adumim Ashdod) which were promoted to the South division from Liga Bet.

North Division

South Division

Promotion play-offs

Test matches

Hapoel Acre won 7–4 on aggregate and remained in Liga Leumit. Maccabi Herzliya remained in Liga Alef.

Relegation play-offs

North division

South division

References

3
Liga Alef seasons
Israel Liga Alef